The Simona Arghir-Sandu Trophy is awarded annually to the leading goal scorer in the Liga Națională (LNHF). It is named in honour of legendary right back Simona Arghir-Sandu. Arghir-Sandu died of cancer in 1995 at the age of 46. The current holder is Alina Vătu of Dunărea Brăila, who scored 180 goals during the 2018–19 season.

Winners

References 
 

Handball trophies and awards